Inkvalita is a rural locality (a selo) in Ishtiburinsky Selsoviet, Untsukulsky District, Republic of Dagestan, Russia. The population was 42 as of 2010.

Geography 
Inkvalita is located 33 km west of Shamilkala (the district's administrative centre) by road. Kolob is the nearest rural locality.

References 

Rural localities in Untsukulsky District